Ratass Church is a medieval church with ogham stone inscriptions in Tralee, County Kerry, Ireland. It is a National Monument.

Location
The church and adjacent graveyard are located on Quill Street, in the eastern suburbs of Tralee.

History
It is believed that a ringfort or embanked enclosure was built here first (Rath Mhaighe Teas, "fort of the southern plain"). Later, a sandstone church was erected in the 10th century. It served as the episcopal seat of a diocese in Kerry from 1111 to 1117, when the seat was moved to Ardfert. The west gable and part of the nave walls belong to this earlier construction; the rest of the church is later.

Ogham Stone

The Ogham Stone is from much earlier. Based on its Primitive Irish grammar, the inscription is estimated to be from around AD 550–600.

The stone is of fine purple sandstone (145 × 34 × 20 cm), with the inscription [A]NM SILLANN MAQ VATTILLOGG ("name of Sílán son of Fáithloga"). It was discovered in 1975 during a cleanup. The walls of a 19th-century burial vault had been built almost flush with it.

References

Religion in County Kerry
Archaeological sites in County Kerry
National Monuments in County Kerry
Former churches in the Republic of Ireland
Ogham inscriptions
6th-century inscriptions
Buildings and structures in Tralee